The 2014 Formula Renault 2.0 Alps Series was the fourth year of the Formula Renault 2.0 Alps series. The championship began on 5 April at Imola and finished on 5 October at Jerez after fourteen races held at seven meetings.

Koiranen GP driver Nyck de Vries, in his second season of competing in Formula Renault 2.0 Alps and his third season in Formula Renault overall, dominated the championship from the opening round, clinching the overall championship title with a round to spare. De Vries took nine overall wins during the season, with an additional class victory at Jerez, behind wildcard driver Bruno Bonifacio, who took the overall win. The remaining wins were shared between junior championship frontrunners Charles Leclerc and Matevos Isaakyan, who took doubles at Monza and the Red Bull Ring respectively. Leclerc prevailed in both championship battles; he beat Isaakyan by 19 points in the overall championship for second place, while Leclerc padded the advantage to 33 points for the junior championship honours. Koiranen GP comfortably won the teams' championship, finishing almost 150 points clear of the next best team, Fortec Motorsports.

Drivers and teams

Race calendar and results
The seven-event calendar for the 2014 season was announced on 28 November 2013. As in 2012, only three rounds were held in Italy (Monza, Imola and Mugello), versus six in 2013. The four rounds outside Italy consisted of races at the Pau Grand Prix, the Red Bull Ring, Spa-Francorchamps and – for the first time – Jerez.

Championship standings

Drivers' Championship

Notes:
† — Drivers did not finish the race, but were classified as they completed over 90% of the race distance.

Juniors' championship

Teams' championship
Prior to each round of the championship, two drivers from each team – if applicable – are nominated to score teams' championship points.

Footnotes

References

External links
 

Alps
Formula Renault 2.0 Alps
Formula Renault 2.0 Alps
Renault Alps